Merchez is a surname. Notable people with the surname include:

 Désiré Mérchez (1882–1968), French swimmer and water polo player
 Marianne Merchez (born 1960), Belgian doctor